Gandao Dam, officially Abdul Shakoor Dam since December 2019, is a gravity dam built near town of Ghalanai in Mohmand Agency of FATA, Pakistan. It was initially is expected to complete in 2015, with projected cost of PKR 449 Millions. 

The dam has a height of 105 feet and lengths 250 feet. It will have total water storage capacity of around 810 acre feet.

Timeline 
Construction of dam started in January 2013. The site was attacked by militants on February 17, 2013, with three of its workers being killed. Progress on the dam was stopped and did not resume until 2018. Gandao dam was "almost ready" as of March 2019, with its completion expected by June 2019.

In December 2019, Khyber Pakhtunkhwa cabinet decided to rename the dam after Abdul Shakoor, contractor of the dam killed by terrorists in 2018.

See also
 List of dams and reservoirs in Pakistan

References

Dams in Pakistan
Buildings and structures in Khyber Pakhtunkhwa
Gravity dams
Dams in Khyber Pakhtunkhwa